Walter Nelson Martínez Martínez (born 1941) is a Venezuelan award-winning journalist, originally from Uruguay. Martínez's career spans over three decades in radio, television and the press. He is best known for his work in international relations, and also for using a patch in his right eye, due to a home plumbing accident.

He was a war correspondent during the 1980s and 1990s. He worked for the Venezuelan State TV until 2005, where he hosted and produced his one-hour-long program Dossier every night at ten.  Additionally, he hosted a radio version of that program on Radio Nacional de Venezuela, also state-owned.

Dossier returned to the air on 15 September 2008 when the program was given the same time slot on Venezuelan State TV live on weekdays at night. The program is broadcast a few hours later on TeleSUR.

Martínez is famous for these catchphrases "nuestra querida, contaminada y única nave espacial" which translates to our beloved, polluted and sole spaceship, referring to planet Earth. He would begin every radio and TV address with the phrase. And "Acontecimientos en pleno desarrollo" referring to the events taking place.

In April 2016, Walter Martinez received the Felix Elmuza Medal, top award given by the Association of Cuban Journalists (UPEC) to national and foreign professionals in the field.

References

External links
 Soberania.org Column
 Venezuelan National Radio website
 Venezuelan Ministry of Communication and Information

 1930 births
 Living people
 Uruguayan Air Force personnel
 Uruguayan expatriates in Venezuela
 Uruguayan journalists
 Venezuelan television presenters
 Venezuelan war correspondents